Ptychostomum capillare, formerly designated as Bryum capillare, is a species of moss belonging to the family Bryaceae.

It has cosmopolitan distribution.

Ptychostomum capillare is known to be able to use artificial light to grow in places which are otherwise devoid of natural light, such as Crystal Cave in Wisconsin.

References

Bryaceae